All Saints' Memorial Church is a small stone Gothic-style Episcopal church built in 1864 by Richard Upjohn in Navesink, New Jersey.  A National Historic Landmark, the church complex, which includes the rectory, stable, and carriage house, is a well-preserved example of the late work of Upjohn.

History
The church was one of the early small parishes begun by English families that settled in Riceville (now Navesink), New Jersey. Services were begun by the family of John Henry Stevens, from the Isle of Wight. One of Stevens daughters married Charles E. Milnor, a Philadelphia Quaker who was "read out of meeting" for marrying an Episcopalian. He, John Henry Stevens, and other members of their family and friends were the leaders in the formation of a congregation and the foundation of the parish of "All Saints' Memorial Church in the Highlands of Navesink." The certificate of incorporation, dated July 16, 1864, is signed by Charles E. Milnor, Warden and E. M. Hartshorne, Secretary of the Vestry.

As the congregation grew, Milnor began a school program which flourished, with 70 children enrolled shortly after opening. Mrs. James A. Edgar, a devout member, wished to establish a church, but because of her untimely death, it was left to her father and husband to endow the church in her memory. Thus on October 7, 1863, the corner stone was laid by the Bishop of New Jersey, the Right Reverend William Henry Odenheimer. Odenheimer, along with Bishop George Washington Doane of Burlington and Bishop J. M. Wainwright of Trinity Church in New York City were the three most powerful Episcopalians in the United States at mid-century and all three commissioned Upjohn churches.

The original 1864 buildings were the church and schoolhouse. All Saints grew and added three buildings to the complex: the parish house in 1865, the rectory in 1869, and the carriage sheds at the turn of the century.

Design
The church itself somewhat resembles St. James-the-Less in Philadelphia, which deeply impressed Upjohn. It is believed that he saw it while working in Burlington for Bishop Doane. The influence of St. James is seen in a number of these small parish churches like All Saints'--the simplicity, dignity, and simple stone masses without much ornament are typical of Upjohn's preference for what he called "truth" in Gothic Revival architecture, and with these small churches he had established the concept of  taste and competence. It is then entirely fitting that he should have been one of the founders and the first President of the American Institute of Architects.

Gothic Revival architecture was well expressed in churches, and most notably in English parish churches. As Professor of art history William Pierson wrote on the American manifestation of parishes, "Quite apart from stylistic considerations, a small asymmetrical parish church of stone related far more sympathetically to the countryside of rural America than did the stern, gleaming white boxes of the Greek Revival. Moreover, the New York Ecclesiological Society aggressively maintained independence from its English counterpart, and in the articles which appeared in the New York Ecclesiologist, the American avoided as far as possible the complicated byways of high Ecclesiology, dealing instead with such matters as the honest use of materials, economy, and the need to maintain actual designs within the limits of local capability. They also stressed simplicity, pointing out that it was not necessary to make a church elaborate in order to have it fulfill its doctrinal purpose."

This period of architectural history had a vitality and cohesiveness that would not be seen again until Henry Hobson Richardson's work at the end of the 19th century.

References

External links

 Official website

Episcopal church buildings in New Jersey
Churches completed in 1864
19th-century Episcopal church buildings
Churches in Monmouth County, New Jersey
Richard Upjohn church buildings
National Historic Landmarks in New Jersey
Churches on the National Register of Historic Places in New Jersey
Middletown Township, New Jersey
National Register of Historic Places in Monmouth County, New Jersey
New Jersey Register of Historic Places